"The Entertainer" is a 1983 song by English pop/new wave band The Belle Stars. It was the band's tenth single overall and fourth and final to fail to chart.

Background
The song has the singer questioning about how entertainers express themselves through music and how one can live as a "dark recluse" or "recluso" as the song depicts. It turned out to be the fourth and final single of the band to fail to chart, which caused tension in the band, making four members quit in 1984, after the release of 80's Romance.

Music video
The music video begins with the band members dancing terribly with men. It then shows Jennie Matthias questioning a jazz singer about how he lives his life. After questioning to him the first verse, he spontaneously grabs and twirls her around for most of the chorus. At the end of the chorus, while still being held in "the entertainer's" arms, Jennie winks as if she is now attracted to the performer. During the second verse, the band goes into a marching sequence wearing war uniforms. During the final parts, the band is shown now playing instruments and showing many people wearing numbers on their backs as an audition technique.

Track listings
France Vinyl 7" Single (106009)
 "The Entertainer"
 "Ci Ya Ya"

UK Vinyl 7" Single (BUY 187)
 "The Entertainer"
 "The Spider"

UK Vinyl 12" Single (S-BUY 187)
 "The Entertainer [Extended Version]"
 "The Spider"

References

1983 singles
The Belle Stars songs
1983 songs
Stiff Records singles